The Indian FTR (formerly FTR 1200) is a standard motorcycle manufactured by Polaris Inc. under the Indian Motorcycle marque since 2019.

The FTR1200 and its derivative, the FTR1200S, have been noted as having design cues from the sport of flat track racing, including the airbox location, dual exhaust pipes, lightweight appearance, in contradistinction to the usual American cruiser motorcycle,  and "directly target[s] enthusiast riders who currently have traditionally favored the Ducati Monster, Triumph Speed Triple and BMW R nineT". The "sport" model FTR1200S has electronic stability control and wheelie control, with gyroscopic input to the ABS and other systems to make them lean sensitive.

FTR750
The Indian Scout FTR750 flat track racing motorcycle is similar in appearance.

References

External links

FTR1200
Motorcycles introduced in 2019
Standard motorcycles
Motorcycles of the United States